Jesús Ricardo Liranzo Graterol (born 2 November 1995) is a Venezuelan diver. He competed in the men's 10 metre platform at the 2016 Summer Olympics, where he finished 21st out of 28 competitors.

References

1995 births
Living people
Divers at the 2016 Summer Olympics
Venezuelan male divers
Olympic divers of Venezuela
21st-century Venezuelan people
Competitors at the 2022 South American Games